Fairy cakes may refer to:

 A British cupcake, typically of a smaller size than the American variety
 Hebeloma crustuliniforme, a poisonous mushroom